Smittina is a genus of bryozoans belonging to the family Smittinidae.

The genus has cosmopolitan distribution.

Species:

Smittia incisa 
Smittia levinseni 
Smittia robusta 
Smittia schlumbergeri 
Smittia subtorquata 
Smittia zuccari 
Smittina abditavicularis 
Smittina abyssicola 
Smittina acaroensis 
Smittina acicularis 
Smittina acuminata 
Smittina affinis 
Smittina alata 
Smittina alticollarita 
Smittina altirostris 
Smittina anecdota 
Smittina antarctica 
Smittina arctica 
Smittina areolata 
Smittina asymmetrica 
Smittina aviculifera 
Smittina azorensis 
Smittina baccata 
Smittina bassleri 
Smittina bathydonta 
Smittina bella 
Smittina beringia 
Smittina bidentata 
Smittina brevis 
Smittina canavarii 
Smittina cervicornis 
Smittina chilensis 
Smittina confluens 
Smittina confusa 
Smittina cophia 
Smittina cordata 
Smittina coronata 
Smittina crepidula 
Smittina cribraria 
Smittina crystallina 
Smittina ctenocondyla 
Smittina curta 
Smittina curvirostrata 
Smittina cylindrica 
Smittina deangelisi 
Smittina depressa 
Smittina derwiesi 
Smittina dieuzeidei 
Smittina diffidentia 
Smittina diplostoma 
Smittina directa 
Smittina discoidea 
Smittina eagari 
Smittina ectoproctolitica 
Smittina emiliana 
Smittina euparypha 
Smittina excentrica 
Smittina excertiaviculata 
Smittina exclusa 
Smittina exigua 
Smittina ferruginea 
Smittina fontensis 
Smittina forata 
Smittina forticula 
Smittina fragaria 
Smittina glebula 
Smittina grandicella 
Smittina grandifossa 
Smittina granulata 
Smittina granulosa 
Smittina hanaishiensis 
Smittina hatsushima 
Smittina humilis 
Smittina impellucida 
Smittina imragueni 
Smittina inarmata 
Smittina incernicula 
Smittina insulata 
Smittina invisitata 
Smittina isabelae 
Smittina jacobensis 
Smittina jacquelinae 
Smittina jeddreysi 
Smittina jordii 
Smittina jullieni 
Smittina kobjakovae 
Smittina kukuiula 
Smittina kussakini 
Smittina labiatula 
Smittina landsborovii 
Smittina lebruni 
Smittina lecointrei 
Smittina leda 
Smittina leptodentata 
Smittina lobata 
Smittina maccullochae 
Smittina macgillivrayi 
Smittina malleolus 
Smittina malouinensis 
Smittina marionensis 
Smittina messiniensis 
Smittina microtheca 
Smittina migottoi 
Smittina minima 
Smittina minuscula 
Smittina molarifera 
Smittina monacha 
Smittina mucronata 
Smittina muliebris 
Smittina multanguloporata 
Smittina nitidissima 
Smittina nodai 
Smittina normani 
Smittina obicullata 
Smittina obicullatoidea 
Smittina oblita 
Smittina obscura 
Smittina oculata 
Smittina orbavicularia 
Smittina ordinata 
Smittina osburni 
Smittina ovirotula 
Smittina palisada 
Smittina papillifera 
Smittina parviovicellosa 
Smittina personata 
Smittina pileata 
Smittina pliofistulata 
Smittina pocilla 
Smittina porelloides 
Smittina porrigens 
Smittina portiuscula 
Smittina pouyetae 
Smittina protrusa 
Smittina pseudoacutirostris 
Smittina pseudocompressa 
Smittina pulchra 
Smittina punctata 
Smittina punctifera 
Smittina puncturata 
Smittina pupa 
Smittina purpurea 
Smittina remotorostrata 
Smittina reptans 
Smittina reticuloides 
Smittina retifrons 
Smittina rigida 
Smittina rogickae 
Smittina rosacea 
Smittina rosefieldensis 
Smittina salsa 
Smittina scrupea 
Smittina seguenzai 
Smittina sextapuncta 
Smittina sigillata 
Smittina sitella 
Smittina smitti 
Smittina smittiana 
Smittina smittiella 
Smittina sordida 
Smittina spathulifera 
Smittina spiraminifera 
Smittina stigmatophora 
Smittina stricta 
Smittina subcordata 
Smittina terraenovae 
Smittina thompsoni 
Smittina torques 
Smittina triangularis 
Smittina tuberosa 
Smittina tubulata 
Smittina umbilicata 
Smittina undulimargo 
Smittina unicus 
Smittina uruguayensis 
Smittina uschakowi 
Smittina uttleyi 
Smittina vaciva 
Smittina variavicularis 
Smittina veleroa 
Smittina volcanica

References

Bryozoan genera